Maa Shakti  is an Indian mythological television series that aired on Big Magic from 17 October 2017 and ended on 22 November 2017. It used to air everyday at 7 p.m. on Big Magic.

Cast 
 Dalljiet Kaur as Devi Durga

References

External links 

 Maa Shakti on IMDb

Indian television series about Hindu deities
2017 Indian television series debuts
2017 Indian television series endings
Big Magic original programming